Biblioteca Las Américas (BLA) is the main library of the South Texas Independent School District.

History
Groundbreaking for Biblioteca Las Américas took place on November 21, 1996, and it opened on January 5, 1998. The dedication of BLA took place on January 21, 1998, with featured speaker Barbara Bush. BLA comprises 33,370 square feet and is located in the Mercedes complex of South Texas Independent School District. This library is shared by two campuses: The Science Academy of South Texas and South Texas High School for Health Professions.

References

External links
Library Website
South Texas Independent School District
Science Academy
Med High

South Texas Independent School District
Libraries in Hidalgo County, Texas